Likar Arturo Ramos Concha (born September 8, 1985, in Barranquilla, Atlántico) is a boxer from Colombia, who participated in the 2004 Summer Olympics for his native South American country.

Amateur
He started boxing at age nine, according to his profile on the official website of the 2004 Summer Olympics. Ramos Concha made his debut for Colombia at the 2002 Central American and Caribbean Games in San Salvador, El Salvador, winning a silver medal.

In 2003 he won the gold medal at the Pan American Games.

In Athens he was stopped in the round of sixteen of the Featherweight (57 kg) division by Belarus' Mikhail Biarnadski.

Pro
He started his professional career unspectacularly, losing two of his first twelve bouts.  However, after November 2006, he won eleven straight bouts. He has a professional record of 24–4, 18 KOs.

On November 19, 2009, he defeated Angel Granados via twelve-rounds unanimous decision in Medellín, Colombia for the vacant WBA Interim Super Featherweight Championship.

On July 16, 2011, he lost to Juan Manuel Marquez at the Plaza de Toros in Cancun, Quintana Roo, Mexico. “Dinamita” Marquez landed a hard right hand on Likar's chin who fell ending the bout at 1:47 in the first round.

References

External links
 
 

1985 births
Olympic boxers of Colombia
Living people
Boxers at the 2003 Pan American Games
Boxers at the 2004 Summer Olympics
Sportspeople from Barranquilla
Colombian male boxers
Pan American Games gold medalists for Colombia
Pan American Games medalists in boxing
Central American and Caribbean Games silver medalists for Colombia
Competitors at the 2002 Central American and Caribbean Games
Featherweight boxers
Central American and Caribbean Games medalists in boxing
Medalists at the 2003 Pan American Games
21st-century Colombian people